Íker Fernández (born 9 September 1977) is a Spanish snowboarder. He competed at the 1998 Winter Olympics, the 2002 Winter Olympics and the 2006 Winter Olympics.

References

External links
 

1977 births
Living people
Spanish male snowboarders
Olympic snowboarders of Spain
Snowboarders at the 1998 Winter Olympics
Snowboarders at the 2002 Winter Olympics
Snowboarders at the 2006 Winter Olympics
Sportspeople from San Sebastián
21st-century Spanish people